Amlai is a census town in Shahdol district in the state of Madhya Pradesh, India.

Demographics
 India census,  Amlai had a population of 30,292. Males constitute 53% of the population and females 47%. Amlai has an average literacy rate of 65%, higher than the national average of 59.5%; with 61% of the male and 39% of the female population literate. 15% of the population is under 6 years of age.

The census of 2011 recorded a population of 20,677 with males constituting 10,731 and females 9,946.

Transport
Amlai has a  railway station on the Bilaspur–Katni line.

References

Shahdol
Cities and towns in Shahdol district